Renate Aichinger (born 28 November 1976 in Salzburg) is an Austrian playwright and theatre director. She studied theatre, film and media studies at the University of Vienna, during which time she worked in various small theatres in Vienna including Junges Schauspielhaus Zürich, Stadttheater Gießen and Vorarlberger Landestheater. Since 2009 she has been working at the Jungen Burg Wien. Since the 2012/13 season she has also directed the Bürgertheater of the Landestheater Niederösterreich (State Theatre of Lower Austria). Two of her plays were nominated for the Retzhofer Dramapreis: "WWW.COM" (2003) and "Rosa Rossi sucht das Morgen" (2011).

References

1976 births
Living people
Austrian women dramatists and playwrights
Austrian theatre directors
People from Salzburg
21st-century Austrian dramatists and playwrights
21st-century Austrian women writers